The reticular membrane (RM, also called reticular lamina or apical cuticular plate) is a thin, stiff lamina that extends from the outer hair cells to the Hensen's cells. The RM is composed of "minute-fiddle-shaped cuticular structures" called the phalangeal extensions of the outer hair cells, interspaced with extensions coming from the outer phalangeal cells. The RM separates endolymph in the cochlear duct from underlying corticolymph and perilymph of the scala tympani.

The hair processes of the outer hair cells emerge through and above the RM, thus immobilizing the apical pole of the outer hair cells. At the opposite basilar pole, the outer hair cells are firmly held by the phalangeal cells. The inner phalangeal cells that surround the inner hair cells reach the surface of the organ of Corti, but, even their inner-most row, are not included in the reticular membrane. Thus, the RM up to the outer edge of the tectorial membrane and does not extend unto the surface of the organ of Corti.

Additional images

Notes

External links
 Diagram at une.edu
 Animation at bioanim.com

Ear